Faith is the debut studio album by American singer Faith Evans. It was released by Bad Boy Records on August 29, 1995 in the United States. A collaboration with the label's main producers The Hitmen, including members Sean "Puff Daddy" Combs and Chucky Thompson, as well as Mark Ledford, Herb Middleton, and Jean-Claude Olivier, among others.

The album, which spawned the gold-certified hits "You Used to Love Me" and "Soon as I Get Home", was certified Platinum by the RIAA in March 1996. Faith contains a cover of the Rose Royce's single "Love Don't Live Here Anymore" which featured an appearance from Mary J. Blige on the album's original pressings.

Production
Newly contracted to Bad Boy Records, Evans was consulted by executive producer Combs to contribute backing vocals and writing skills to Mary J. Blige's My Life (1994) and Usher's self-titled debut album (1994) prior to starting work on her debut record album Faith. Producer Chucky Thompson- who helmed most of the album- recalls meeting Evans for the first time by her doing vocal production work on Usher's album. Though she initially was a protégé of Al B. Sure!'s, she eventually signed to Bad Boy and insisted on Thompson producing her entire album after hearing him playing music on the piano in the studio. Thompson said Evans' first single "You Used To Love Me" was originally planned for her labelmates Total, but Evans wrote to the track after hearing the music and it was the first song finished for her album. The second single "Soon As I Get Home" was done to pass the time at the studio because Thompson had a flight to catch later that day. As he was about to leave, he received a call from Combs insisting he record the music Evans heard him play before he got on the plane. Evans later left a message on Thompson's answering machine- which was the song she wrote and recorded. Thompson said the song was finished and he didn't add any other touches to it.

Another song on the album, "You Don't Understand", was primarily influenced by Evans' marriage to The Notorious B.I.G. The music of R. Kelly was the primary inspiration for the musical arrangement, according to Thompson. The third single from the album was the song "Ain't Nobody". Thompson said it was influenced by the song "Can't Let Her Get Away" by Michael Jackson from his 1991 album Dangerous. When he started on the music, he didn't do the tracking until after Combs came to hear the song and gave him the go ahead to track it. When Thompson attempted the first time after Combs left, the plug came out from the machine and the entire track was erased- which led him having to do it all over again from scratch. The final single released from the album, "Come Over", was initially supposed to be an interlude. However, Evans insisted the interlude should be made into a full song. Another album track on Faith, "All This Love" was written by Evans and her boyfriend prior to her marriage to The Notorious B.I.G., but Thompson revealed the music was composed five years before he met Evans. The CD bonus track "Reasons" featured uncredited background vocals from Blackstreet member Dave Hollister. The reason for his appearance was due to Evans and Blackstreet recording their debut albums at the same studio, but only on different floors. Also originally planned as an interlude, Blackstreet member and producer Teddy Riley came looking for Hollister and overheard the two singing "Reasons". Riley then suggested to Combs that it should be made into a full song. Faith was recorded primarily at The Hit Factory and Combs' personal studio Daddy's House Recording- both of which were based in New York City.

Critical reception

Faith received critical acclaim upon its release. Entertainment Weekly gave the album an A− rating, describing Faith as "packed with sensual, smoky R&B torch songs and titanium-hard hip-hop beats--Faith seems set to take her place at the top of the mountain of young soul divas." Vibe complimented the albums vocal production, noting that Evans "possesses a perfect voice. Folks have likened that voice to rain, and it's an appropriate metaphor [...] can sound as lilting as a summer shower or as electric as a thunderstorm. Her instrument's potential seems boundless [...] more Whitney than Mary, more classic than nouveau." The Source praised Sean Combs production, writing that "for those closet sentimentalists or those who like to get their slow drag on [...] when you're working with the man who perfected the remix, there's still a good chance that Faith will not only be pumping on rainy nights in the crib but also on summer days in the Land Cruisers too." AllMusic editor Stephen Thomas Erlewine remarked that Faith "proves that she is as powerful in the spotlight as she is behind the scenes. Evans builds on a basic, hip-hop-influenced funk, alternating between simmering grooves and sultry ballads. Faith does have a couple of dull spots, but the album is a first-class debut."

Commercial performance
Released on August 29, 1995, the album became a success based on the hit singles "You Used to Love Me", "Soon as I Get Home" and "Ain't Nobody". It was certified platinum by the Recording Industry Association of America (RIAA) with over 1,000,000 copies sold.

Track listing

Sample credits
"No Other Love" contains a sample from "Walk On By", as written by Burt Bacharach and Hal David and performed by Isaac Hayes.
"Fallin' in Love" contains a sample from "Remind Me", as written and performed by Patrice Rushen.
"Give It to Me" samples "In the Mood", as written and performed by Tyrone Davis.

Credits
Credits adapted from liner notes.

 Charles "Prince Charles" Alexander – Mixing, producer, musician
 Victor Bailey – Musician
 "Bassy" Bob Brockman – Engineer
 Regina Carter – Violin
 Sean "Puffy" Combs – Producer, executive producer
 Lane Craven – Engineer
 Akua Dixon – Musician
 Faith Evans – Vocals, songwriting
 Caroline Greyshock – Photography
 Jeffrey Haynes – Musician
 Judith Insell – Musician
 Kevin Johnson – Musician
 Daron Jones – Keyboards, vocals
 Mark Ledford – Producer, trumpet
 Paul Logus – Engineer
 Gerardo Lopez – Engineer
 Tony Maserati – Engineer, mixing

 Darryl McClary – Keyboards
 Fred McFarlane – Keyboards
 Herb Middleton – Keyboards, producer, additional keyboards
 Nasheim Myrick – Engineer
 Axel Niehaus – Engineer, mixing
 Quinnes Parker – Vocals (background)
 Paul Pesco – Guitar
 Harve Pierre – A&R
 Bruce Purse – Trumpet
 John Shriver – Engineer, second engineer
 Tony Smalios – Engineer
 Lisa Terry – Musician
 Kevin Thomas – Engineer
 Chucky Thompson – Producer
 Richard Travali – Engineer, mixing
 Kiyah Wright – Hair stylist
 Mary J. Blige – Vocals

Charts

Weekly charts

Year-end charts

Certifications

References

External links
 
 

1995 debut albums
Albums produced by Sean Combs
Faith Evans albums
Bad Boy Records albums
Arista Records albums